Stefan Adamczak (27 November 1892 – September 1939) was a Polish pole vaulter and chorąży in the Polish Army. He competed in the 1924 Summer Olympics.

During World War I, he fought in the ranks of the Imperial German Army. Following Poland's restoration of independence in 1918, he joined Polish military forces. He fought in Polish-Soviet War and Polish-Ukrainian War. In September 1939, he took part in the defense of the city of Katowice during the German invasion of Poland, where he was most likely killed.

References

External links 
 
 
 

1892 births
1939 deaths
Athletes (track and field) at the 1924 Summer Olympics
Polish male pole vaulters
Olympic athletes of Poland
People from Mansfeld
German Army personnel of World War I
Polish military personnel of World War II
Polish people of the Polish–Ukrainian War
Polish people of the Polish–Soviet War
Recipients of the Cross of Valour (Poland)
Polish military personnel killed in World War II